The Morais Natura 2000 Site (PTCON0023)  is located in the northeast of Portugal. With an area of 12878 (ha) almost entirely in the municipality of Macedo de Cavaleiros (12219 ha), partially integrates the Azibo Reservoir Protected Landscape, extending itself thru the neighboring municipalities of Bragança (546 ha) and Mogadouro (114 ha). 

This average altitude mountainous area, has in its core the Morais Ophiolite Complex, one of the  most representative areas of ultramafic rocks,  and the largest continuous units of serpentinite in Portugal. Covered with several endemic species and communities, the site has high geological, botanical and zoological interest.

Notes

See also

External links
 Natura 2000 Viewer - interactive map (European Environment Agency)
 Natura 2000 data download - the European network of protected sites (European Environment Agency)
 Natura 2000 - the Natura Network Initiative - Natura 2000 at work
 European Commission, DG Environment, Nature and Biodiversity unit
 Natura 2000 newsletter (English, French, German, Spanish, Italian)
 A-Z Areas of Biodiversity Importance: Natura 2000
 European Topic Centre on Biological Diversity
 Natura 2000 Network
 www.azibo.org

Natura 2000 in Portugal
Nature reserves in Portugal
Geography of Bragança District
Tourist attractions in Bragança District